The 1998 Tour de France was the 85th edition of Tour de France, one of cycling's Grand Tours. The Tour began in Dublin, Ireland with a prologue individual time trial on 11 July and Stage 12 occurred on 24 July with a flat stage from Tarascon-sur-Ariège. The race finished on the Champs-Élysées in Paris on 2 August.

Stage 12
24 July 1998 — Tarascon-sur-Ariège to Le Cap d'Agde, 

After the rest day, the Tour came out of the Pyrenees.
The Tour was in uproar. The riders staged a strike over the increased attention given to the drugs scandal. The riders initially refused to ride but then started under neutral conditions. Dutch radio said that the peloton initially rode very slowly indeed for 14 km behind Leblanc's lead car. The neutral conditions were being maintained.  After 16 km of neutral riding and a delay of 2 hours, the Tour officially resumed at around 13.35 European time. Tom Steels took his second sprint victory in the 1998 Tour when he won the mass sprint into Le Cap d'Agde, narrowly beating François Simon and Stéphane Barthe.

Stage 13
25 July 1998 — Frontignan la Peyrade to Carpentras,

Stage 14
26 July 1998 — Valréas to Grenoble,

Stage 15
27 July 1998 — Grenoble to Les Deux Alpes,

Stage 16
28 July 1998 — Vizille to Albertville,

Stage 17
29 July 1998 — Albertville to Aix-les-Bains, 

The stage was neutralised due to a protest by the riders.

Stage 18
30 July 1998 — Aix-les-Bains to Neuchâtel (Switzerland),

Stage 19
31 July 1998 — La Chaux-de-Fonds (Switzerland) to Autun,

Stage 20
1 August 1998 — Montceau-les-Mines to Le Creusot,  (individual time trial)

Stage 21
2 August 1998 — Melun to Paris Champs-Élysées,

References

1998 Tour de France
Tour de France stages